Espinosa de Almanza is a locality located in the municipality of Almanza, in León province, Castile and León, Spain. As of 2020, it has a population of 3.

Geography 
Espinosa de Almanza is located 64km east-northeast of León, Spain.

References

Populated places in the Province of León